Quentin D'Silva is a Pakistani Christian business executive.

Life

D'Silva was born in Karachi, Pakistan and studied at St Patrick's High School, Karachi. He gained an MBA from the University of Karachi.

After graduating he worked in marketing and sales with Reckitt Benckiser and Gillette. In 1997 he joined Shell Pakistan Limited.  He later spent part of his career with Shell in the Middle East, managing a number of geographic areas and across several business lines, including Shell joint ventures. By 24 February 2000 he had risen to Commercial Manager of Shell.

D'Silva had reached the position of Chief Executive Officer of Shell Middle East and central Asia by 2005.  That year he travelled to Dhaka, Bangladesh for the launching of a Ranks Petroleum Ltd and Shell Middle East joint venture.

In May 2006 he was elected to the Board of Shell Pakistan Limited and also appointed Chairman & Chief Executive, a position he held till August 2006.

In 2006 he was also a trustee of the Layton Rahmatulla Benevolent Trust.

He joined the board of PRL in 2006 and resigned in 2007.

He joined Tarmac Middle East in March 2009 as Regional Director. In 2011 he was also a member of the Board of Al Dhahira Tarmac SAOC, Tarmac Oman Limited and Midmac Tarmac Qatar Company WLL.

References

Living people
Pakistani Roman Catholics
Pakistani corporate directors
People from Karachi
St. Patrick's High School, Karachi alumni
University of Karachi alumni
Pakistani people of Goan descent
Institute of Business Administration, Karachi alumni
Year of birth missing (living people)